Boot Party is the first studio album by American alternative rock group Dub Narcotic Sound System. It was released on K Records in 1996.

Critical reception
Trouser Press wrote that "when not delving deep into the usual sorts of ambient studio trickery, the songs hit a ’60s R&B stride, bathing in the stoned soul picnic ambience with uplifting spirit."

Track listing
 "Test Pattern" - 1:36
 "Monkey Hips and Rice" - 4:17
 "Ship to Shore" - 5:24
 "Super Dub Narcotic" - 5:04
 "Afi Tione" - 3:05
 "Shake a Puddin" - 5:29
 "King Harvester" - 0:56
 “Robotica" - 4:49
 "Bunny Echo" - 3:30
 "Boot Party" - 8:06

Personnel
Larry Butler - drums
Lindy Coyne - guitar
Calvin Johnson - melodica
Lois Maffeo - voice
Todd Ranslow - bass
Jen Smith - voice
Brian Weber - guitar, organ
DJ Sayeed - turntables

References

External links
 

1996 debut albums
K Records albums